There are two species of eel named blotched snake eel:
 Callechelys muraena
 Ophichthus erabo